GT Krush Tunap is a professional road bicycle racing women's team which participates in elite women's races. The team was established in 2008 as Swabo Ladies Cycling Team, before gaining UCI status for the 2019 season.

The team also runs three development teams, aimed at training the next generation of riders: Swabo Women Development Team, Swabo Women U19 Development Team and Swabo Women U17 Development Team.

Team roster

Major results
2018
Stage 3 Setmana Ciclista Valenciana, Nicole Steigenga

National champions
2021
 Sweden Cyclo-cross, Nathalie Eklund

References

External links

UCI Women's Teams
Cycling teams based in the Netherlands
Cycling teams established in 2008